Identity Unknown is a 1960 British drama film directed by Frank Marshall and starring Richard Wyler, Pauline Yates and Patricia Plunkett.

Plot summary
Two reporters develop a relationship while investigating an aircraft accident.

Cast
 Richard Wyler as John
 Pauline Yates as Jenny 
 Patricia Plunkett as Betty
 Beatrice Varley as Matron
 Valentine Dyall as Ambrose
 Kenneth Edwards as Reynold
 John Gabriel as Jamieson
 Nyree Dawn Porter as Pam
 Vincent Ball as Ken
 Sheldon Lawrence as Larry
 Derek Blomfield as John Perkins  
 Stella Bonheur as Mrs. Phillips  
 Robert Cawdron as Flynn

References

External links

1960 films
1960 drama films
British drama films
1960s English-language films
British aviation films
1960s British films